Oak Grove Elementary School can refer to:
Oak Grove Elementary School (California)
Oak Grove Elementary School (Georgia)
Oak Grove Elementary School (Chattanooga, Tennessee), listed on the National Register of Historic Places (NRHP) in Hamilton County, Tennessee